An ion-exchange resin or ion-exchange polymer is a resin or polymer that acts as a medium for ion exchange. It is an insoluble matrix (or support structure) normally in the form of small (0.25–1.43 mm radius) microbeads, usually white or yellowish, fabricated from an organic polymer substrate. The beads are typically porous, providing a large surface area on and inside them where the trapping of ions occurs along with the accompanying release of other ions, and thus the process is called ion exchange. There are multiple types of ion-exchange resin. Most commercial resins are made of polystyrene sulfonate.
 

Ion-exchange resins are widely used in different separation, purification, and decontamination processes. The most common examples are water softening and water purification. In many cases ion-exchange resins were introduced in such processes as a more flexible alternative to the use of natural or artificial zeolites. Also, ion-exchange resins are highly effective in the biodiesel filtration process.

Types of resins
Most typical ion-exchange resins are based on crosslinked polystyrene. The actual ion-exchanging sites are introduced after polymerisation. Additionally, in the case of polystyrene, crosslinking is introduced by copolymerisation of styrene and a few percent of divinylbenzene. Crosslinking decreases ion-exchange capacity of the resin and prolongs the time needed to accomplish the ion-exchange processes but improves the robustness of the resin. Particle size also influences the resin parameters; smaller particles have larger outer surface, but cause larger head loss in the column processes.

Besides being made as bead-shaped materials, ion-exchange resins are also produced as membranes. These ion-exchange membranes, which are made of highly cross-linked ion-exchange resins that allow passage of ions, but not of water, are used for electrodialysis.

Four main types of ion-exchange resins differ in their functional groups:
 strongly acidic, typically featuring sulfonic acid groups, e.g. sodium polystyrene sulfonate or polyAMPS,
 strongly basic, typically featuring quaternary amino groups, for example, trimethylammonium groups, e.g. polyAPTAC),
 weakly acidic, typically featuring carboxylic acid groups,
 weakly basic, typically featuring primary, secondary, and/or tertiary amino groups, e.g. polyethylene amine.

Specialised ion-exchange resins are also known such as chelating resins (iminodiacetic acid, thiourea-based resins, and many others).

Anion resins and cation resins are the two most common resins used in the ion-exchange process. While anion resins attract negatively charged ions, cation resins attract positively charged ions.

Anion resins
Anion resins may be either strongly or weakly basic. Strongly basic anion resins maintain their negative charge across a wide pH range, whereas weakly basic anion resins are neutralized at higher pH levels. Weakly basic resins do not maintain their charge at a high pH because they undergo deprotonation. They do, however, offer excellent mechanical and chemical stability. This, combined with a high rate of ion exchange, make weakly base anion resins well suited for the organic salts.

For anion resins, regeneration typically involves treatment of the resin with a strongly basic solution, e.g. aqueous sodium hydroxide. During regeneration, the regenerant chemical is passed through the resin, and trapped negative ions are flushed out, renewing the resin exchange capacity.

Cation-exchange resin
Formula: R−H acidic

The cation exchange method removes the hardness of water but induces acidity in it, which is further removed in the next stage of treatment of water by passing this acidic water through an anion exchange process.

Reaction:
R−H + M+ = R−M + H+.

Anion-exchange resin
Formula: –NR4+OH−

Often these are styrene–divinylbenzene copolymer resins that have quaternary ammonium cations as an integral part of the resin matrix.

Reaction:

 –NR4+OH− + HCl = –NR4+Cl− + H2O.

Anion-exchange chromatography makes use of this principle to extract and purify materials from mixtures or solutions.

Uses

Water softening

In this application, Ion-exchange resins are used to replace the magnesium and calcium ions found in hard water with sodium ions. When the resin is fresh, it contains sodium ions at its active sites. When in contact with a solution containing magnesium and calcium ions (but a low concentration of sodium ions), the magnesium and calcium ions preferentially migrate out of solution to the active sites on the resin, being replaced in solution by sodium ions. This process reaches equilibrium with a much lower concentration of magnesium and calcium ions in solution than was started with.

The resin can be recharged by washing it with a solution containing a high concentration of sodium ions (e.g. it has large amounts of common salt (NaCl) dissolved in it). The calcium and magnesium ions migrate from the resin, being replaced by sodium ions from the solution until a new equilibrium is reached. The salt is used to recharge an ion-exchange resin, which itself is used to soften the water.

Water purification

In this application, ion-exchange resins are used to remove poisonous (e.g. copper) and hazardous metal (e.g. lead or cadmium) ions from solution, replacing them with more innocuous ions, such as sodium and potassium.

Few ion-exchange resins remove chlorine or organic contaminants from water – this is usually done by using an activated charcoal filter mixed in with the resin. There are some ion-exchange resins that do remove organic ions, such as MIEX (magnetic ion-exchange) resins. Domestic water purification resin is not usually recharged – the resin is discarded when it can no longer be used.

Water of highest purity is required for electronics, scientific experiments, production of superconductors, and nuclear industry, among others. Such water is produced using ion-exchange processes or combinations of membrane and ion-exchange methods.

Ion exchange in metal separation

Ion-exchange processes are used to separate and purify metals, including separating uranium from plutonium and other actinides, including thorium; and lanthanum, neodymium, ytterbium, samarium, lutetium, from each other and the other lanthanides. There are two series of rare-earth metals, the lanthanides and the actinides. Members of each family have very similar chemical and physical properties. Ion exchange was for many years the only practical way to separate the rare earths in large quantities. This application was developed in the 1940s by Frank Spedding.  Subsequently, solvent extraction has mostly supplanted use of ion-exchange resins except for the highest-purity products.

A very important case is the PUREX process (plutonium-uranium extraction process), which is used to separate the plutonium and the uranium from the spent fuel products from a nuclear reactor, and to be able to dispose of the waste products. Then, the plutonium and uranium are available for making nuclear-energy materials, such as new reactor fuel and nuclear weapons.

Ion-exchange beads are also an essential component in in-situ leach uranium mining. In-situ recovery involves the extraction of uranium-bearing water (grading as low as 0.05% U3O8) through boreholes. The extracted uranium solution is then filtered through the resin beads. Through an ion-exchange process, the resin beads attract uranium from the solution. Uranium-loaded resins are then transported to a processing plant, where U3O8 is separated from the resin beads, and yellowcake is produced. The resin beads can then be returned to the ion-exchange facility, where they are reused.

The ion-exchange process is also used to separate other sets of very similar chemical elements, such as zirconium and hafnium, which incidentally is also very important for the nuclear industry. Zirconium is practically transparent to free neutrons, used in building reactors, but hafnium is a very strong absorber of neutrons, used in reactor control rods.

Catalysis
Ion exchange resins are used in organic synthesis, e.g. for esterification and hydrolysis.  Being high surface area and insoluble, they are suitable for vapor-phase and liquid-phase reactions.  Examples can be found where basic (OH−-form) of ion exchange resins are used to neutralize of ammonium salts and convert quaternary ammonium halides to hydroxides.  Acidic (H+-form) ion exchange resins have been used as solid acid catalysts for scission of ether protecting groups. and for rearrangement reactions.

Juice purification
Ion-exchange resins are used in the manufacture of fruit juices such as orange and cranberry juice, where they are used to remove bitter-tasting components and so improve the flavor. This allows tart or poorer-tasting fruit sources to be used for juice production.

Sugar manufacturing
Ion-exchange resins are used in the manufacturing of sugar from various sources. They are used to help convert one type of sugar into another type of sugar, and to decolorize and purify sugar syrups.

Pharmaceuticals
Ion-exchange resins are used in the manufacturing of pharmaceuticals, not only for catalyzing certain reactions, but also for isolating and purifying pharmaceutical active ingredients.
Three ion-exchange resins, sodium polystyrene sulfonate, colestipol, and cholestyramine, are used as active ingredients. Sodium polystyrene sulfonate is a strongly acidic ion-exchange resin and is used to treat hyperkalemia.  Colestipol is a weakly basic ion-exchange resin and is used to treat hypercholesterolemia. Cholestyramine is a strongly basic ion-exchange resin and is also used to treat hypercholesterolemia. Colestipol and cholestyramine are known as bile acid sequestrants.

Ion-exchange resins are also used as excipients in pharmaceutical formulations such as tablets, capsules, gums, and suspensions. In these uses the ion-exchange resin can have several different functions, including taste-masking, extended release, tablet disintegration, increased bioavailability, and improving the chemical stability of the active ingredients.

Selective polymeric chelators have been proposed for maintenance therapy of some pathologies, where chronic ion accumulation occurs, such as Wilson disease (where copper accumulation occurs) or hereditary hemochromatosis (iron overload, where iron accumulation occurs) These polymers or particles have a negligible or null systemic biological availability and they are designed to form stable complexes with Fe2+ and Fe3+ in the GIT and thus limiting the uptake of these ions and their long-term accumulation. Although this method has only a limited efficacy, unlike small-molecular chelators (deferasirox, deferiprone, or deferoxamine), such an approach may have only minor side effects in sub-chronic studies. Interestingly, the simultaneous chelation of Fe2+ and Fe3+ increases the treatment efficacy.

CO2 Capture from Ambient Air
Anion exchange resins readily absorb CO2 when dry and release it again when exposed to moisture. This makes them one of the most promising materials for direct carbon capture from ambient air, or direct air capture, since the moisture swing replaces the more energy-intensive temperature swing or pressure swing used with other sorbents. A prototype demonstrating this process has been developed by Klaus Lackner at the Center for Negative Carbon Emissions.

See also
 Polyelectrolyte
 Water softening

Notes

Further reading
 
 
 Ion Exchangers (K. Dorfner, ed.), Walter de Gruyter, Berlin, 1991.
 C. E. Harland, Ion exchange: Theory and Practice,  The Royal Society of Chemistry, Cambridge, 1994.
 Ion exchange (D. Muraviev, V. Gorshkov, A. Warshawsky),  M. Dekker, New York, 2000.
 A. A. Zagorodni, Ion Exchange Materials: Properties and Applications, Elsevier, Amsterdam, 2006.
 Alexandratos S D . Ion-Exchange Resins: A Retrospective from Industrial and Engineering Chemistry Research. Industrial & Engineering Chemistry Research, 2009.
 Catalyst system comprising an ion exchange resin and a dimethyl thiazolidine promoter, Hasyagar U K , Mahalingam R J , Kishan G, WO 2012.

Polymers
Water
Synthetic resins
Polyelectrolytes